Stanley Thomas Amos (born 1907, date of death unknown) was an English professional footballer of the 1920s. Born in Cradley Heath, Staffordshire, he joined Gillingham from Cradley Heath St Luke's in 1926 and went on to make 31 appearances for the club in The Football League, scoring 13 goals. He left to return to his former club in 1928.

References

1907 births
English footballers
Gillingham F.C. players
People from Cradley Heath
Year of death missing
Association football forwards